Richard E. Flanagan (October 31, 1927 in Sidney, Ohio – September 27, 1997) was a National Football League center who played eight seasons. Flanagan played high school football for Sidney High School and college football for Ohio State University. He was drafted by the Chicago Bears in the 10th round of the 1948 NFL Draft. He played running back in college and his first year with the Bears. He also played linebacker and offensive guard during his professional career.

Flanagan was a member of the Detroit Lions team that defeated the Cleveland Browns to win the 1952 NFL Championship.

Honors
The Flanagan Sports Complex in Sidney is named after him. 

The Sidney High School football MVP trophy is named after Flanagan and his jersey number has been retired by the school.

References

External links
Dick Flanagan at Pro Football Reference 

1927 births
1997 deaths
American football offensive linemen
Chicago Bears players
Detroit Lions players
Ohio State Buckeyes football players
People from Sidney, Ohio
Pittsburgh Steelers players
Players of American football from Ohio